Abriola is a town and comune in the province of Potenza, in the Southern Italian region of Basilicata. It is bounded by the comuni of Anzi, Calvello, Marsico Nuovo, Pignola, Sasso di Castalda, Tito.

References 

Cities and towns in Basilicata